Omid Seydali (born 7 May 1999) is an Iranian footballer who plays as a midfielder who currently plays for Iranian club Foolad in the Persian Gulf Pro League.

Club career

Foolad
He made his debut for Foolad in 9th fixtures of 2018–19 Iran Pro League against Padideh.

Honours
Foolad
Hazfi Cup: 2020–21
Iranian Super Cup: 2021

References

1999 births
Living people
Iranian footballers
Foolad FC players
Association football defenders
People from Behbahan
Sportspeople from Khuzestan province